New London Airport may refer to:

 Groton–New London Airport, Groton, Connecticut, U.S. (IATA: GON, ICAO: KGON, FAA LID: GON) 
 New London Airport (Virginia), Forest, Virginia, U.S. (FAA LID: W90)
 Thames Estuary Airport, a potential new airport for London, England